New Irish Farm Cemetery is a Commonwealth War Graves Commission burial ground for the dead of the First World War located near Ypres (Dutch: Ieper) in Belgium on the Western Front.

The cemetery grounds were assigned to the United Kingdom in perpetuity by King Albert I of Belgium in recognition of the sacrifices made by the British Empire in the defence and liberation of Belgium during the war.

Foundation

The cemetery, named after the nickname of a nearby farmhouse, was established in August 1917. It was used until the November, then again in April and May 1918. At the time of the armistice, it was a small cemetery with 73 graves. It was enlarged by concentrating graves from the battlefields to the north-east of Ypres and from small cemeteries.

The cemetery was designed by Sir Reginald Blomfield.

Concentrated cemeteries
The following cemeteries were concentrated into New Irish Farm:
 Admiral's, Boezinge (19 soldiers)
 Canopus Trench, Langemark (12)
 Comedy Farm, Langemark (29)
 Cross Roads, Sint Jan (19)
 Ferdinand Farm, Langemark (15)
 Francois Farm, Langemark (23)
 Fusilier Farm, Boezinge (14)
 Glimpse Cottage, Boezinge (18)
 Irish Farm, Sint Jan (54)
 La Miterie German, Lomme (8)
 Manor Road, Zillebeke (19)
 Mirfield, Boezinge (16)
 Paratonniers Farm, Boezinge (13)
 Pilckem Road, Boezinge (27)
 Sint Jan Churchyard (44)
 Spree Farm, Langemark (14)
 Vanheule Farm, Langemark (22)
 Yorkshire, Sint Jan (22)

References

External links
 
 

Commonwealth War Graves Commission cemeteries in Belgium
Cemeteries and memorials in West Flanders
World War I cemeteries in Belgium